Teenage Mutant Ninja Turtles 2: Battle Nexus is a third person beat 'em up video game, released in 2004 by Konami. It is the sequel to Teenage Mutant Ninja Turtles and is based on the 2003 TV series.

The game has cel-shaded graphics, four-player gameplay, and includes the first TMNT arcade game as an unlockable bonus. Teenage Mutant Ninja Turtles 2 Battle Nexus is based mostly on the end of the second season of the 2003 animated TMNT series. The game also has 4 tournaments consisting of waves of enemy attacks.

The cinematic cutscenes are adapted from various episodes in the cartoon series featuring the Feudal Japan arc in which the origin of Oroku Saki is discovered.

Gameplay

Unlike the 2003 TMNT game, Battle Nexus supports up to four players. Each player may select a "team" that consists of a turtle and an unlockable character that can replace the turtle. Four teams are present in the game, if less than four players are playing, one player may select more teams and cycle through them in the game. Each team has their own specific abilities that can help players progress through the game. Blue Team can attack while dashing, and cut through certain obstacles (gates, trees, bamboo, etc.). Red Team can lift and push certain heavy objects. Orange team can reflect arrows with their guard (and Michelangelo can fly with his nunchucks). Purple team can utilize computer consoles (and Donatello can fire a laser instead of throwing shuriken).

Unlike the previous game, players share one health bar so if one player gets hurt, the health decreases for all of them. Characters have "weak" and "strong" attacks and they do different moves with different combinations. To beat the level, you must either get to the designated point of the level, kill all enemies, kill the boss, survive until the time runs out or do the specific goal until the time runs out.

Side goals are to collect artifacts that are usually in hidden or hard-to-reach places. To collect crystal pieces that increase your attack, defense, charge attack and shuriken throwing abilities.

Critical reception 

Battle Nexus received a mostly negative critical reception, getting a 1.5/5 score from GameSpy and 6/10 from IGN. Reviewers complained of repetitive gameplay, poor controls and terrible AI.

References

External links

 

2004 video games
Cooperative video games
Game Boy Advance games
Konami beat 'em ups
GameCube games
PlayStation 2 games
Xbox games
Windows games
Battle Nexus
Video games developed in Japan
Video games about time travel

Video game sequels
Video games with cel-shaded animation
Video games set in New York City
3D platform games
Usagi Yojimbo